The oldest running marathon in Scotland, the first Moray Marathon was held in 1982 and since then it has developed into a 3 in 1 running event incorporating the Marathon, Half Marathon and 10K Road Races.  In 2014 the venue was changed from the Cooper Park to the Glen Moray Distillery, and was run on a different course.

Moray Marathon 2006 
The 2006 event celebrated the 25th anniversary of the marathon with Simon Pride (Forres Harriers) finishing in 2:39:53 to win the event for the 5th time and Kate Jenkins (Gala Harriers) first woman home in 2:58:29 to win her 8th Moray Marathon.

The half marathon was won by John Goodall (Keith and District) in 1:15:35 with Sarah Liebnitz (U\A ex Moray Roadrunners Jnr) first woman in 1:33:59.
The 10K was won by Mike Stewart (Keith and District) in 33:51, first woman home was Elaine Whyte (Fraserburgh RC) in 39:58.

Marathon winners 1982–

Course records (Finish at Cooper park 1982-2013) 
Marathon
Men – Simon Pride – Keith & District – 2 h 21 min 17 s
Women - Trudi Thomson – Pitreavie AAC – 2 h 49 min 43 s
Half marathon
Men – Graham Crawford – Springburn Harriers – 1 h 06 min 09 s
Women – Lyn Harding – Houghton AC – 1h 14 min 58 s
10 K
Men – Chris Hall – Aberdeen AAC – 29 min 46 s
Women – Lyn Harding – Houghton AC – 33 min 58 s

Course records (Finish at Glen Moray Distillery since 2014) 
Marathon
Men – Wayne Dashper - Forres Harriers - 2 h 45 min 40 s (2014)
Women - Debbie Moore - Unattached - 3 h 16 min 12 s (2015)
Half marathon
Men – John Newsom - Inverness Harriers - 1h 12 min 55 s (2015)
Women – Sarah Liebnitz - Inverness Harriers - 1 h 22 min 10 s (2014)
10 K
Men – Gordon Lennox - Forres Harriers - 33 min 10 s (2014 & 2015)
Women – Sarah Liebnitz - Inverness Harriers - 38 min 16 s (2016)

References

External links 
 www.moraymarathon.com – Official Site of the Moray Marathon.
 www.morayroadrunners.com – Moray Roadrunners web site.
 www.forresharriers.fsnet.co.uk – Forres Harriers web site

Athletics competitions in Scotland
Marathons in Scotland
Sport in Moray